Raymond Gordon Finney Jenkins (26 September 1898 – 16 January 1998) was an Irish Anglican priest: he was Archdeacon of Dublin from 1961 to 1974.

Jenkins was born in 1898, educated at Trinity College, Dublin and ordained in 1931.  After curacies in Dublin he went back to his old college, occupying a number of roles including Dean of Residence of the Divinity Hostel and Lecturer. In 1962 he was appointed Chancellor of St Patrick's Cathedral, Dublin, he also served in the (Anglo-Catholic) All Saints Church, Grangegorman in Dublin.

References

1898 births
1998 deaths
Academics of Trinity College Dublin
Archdeacons of Dublin